George Franklin Edmunds (February 1, 1828February 27, 1919) was a Republican U.S. Senator from Vermont.  Before entering the U.S. Senate, he served in a number of high-profile positions, including Speaker of the Vermont House of Representatives, and President pro tempore of the Vermont State Senate.

Edmunds was born in Richmond, Vermont and began to study law while still a teenager; he proved an adept student, and was admitted to the bar as soon as he reached the minimum required age of 21.  He practiced in Burlington and became active in local politics and government.

After terms in the Vermont House of Representatives and Vermont State Senate, Edmunds was appointed to the U.S. Senate in 1866, filling the vacancy caused by the death of Solomon Foot.  He was subsequently elected by the Vermont General Assembly, and reelected in 1868, 1874, 1880, and 1886.  Edmunds served from April 1866 until resigning in November 1891.  As a longtime member of the U.S. Senate, he served in a variety of leadership posts, including chairman of the Committee on Pensions, the Committee on the Judiciary, the Committee on Private Land Claims, and the Committee on Foreign Relations.  He was also the leader of the Senate's Republicans in his roles as President pro tempore of the Senate and chairman of the Republican Conference.

Edmunds was an unsuccessful candidate for president at the 1880 and 1884 Republican National Conventions.

After leaving the Senate he practiced law in Philadelphia.  He later lived in retirement in Pasadena, California, where he died in 1919.  He was buried at Green Mount Cemetery in Burlington, Vermont. Two years following his death, a published autobiography by Richard F. Pettigrew accused Edmunds of being a "senatorial bribe-taker" and "distinctly dishonest."

Early life
George F. Edmunds was born in Richmond, Vermont on February 1, 1828, the son of Ebenezer Edmunds and Naomi (Briggs) Edmunds.  He attended the local schools and was privately tutored.  Edmunds began studying law as a teenager, spending time in both the office of his brother-in-law A. B. Maynard and the office of David A. Smalley and Edward J. Phelps.  He was admitted to the bar as soon as he was eligible in 1849.  He practiced in Burlington, and became active in politics by serving in local offices including Town Meeting Moderator.

While practicing law, one of the students who studied under him was Russell S. Taft, who later served as Lieutenant Governor and as Chief Justice of the Vermont Supreme Court.

A Republican, he was elected to the Vermont House of Representatives in 1854.  He served until 1860, and was Speaker from 1857 to 1860.  He moved to the Vermont State Senate in 1861, where he served until 1862.  While in the State Senate, Edmunds was chosen to serve as President pro tempore.

United States Senate

After the death of U.S. Senator Solomon Foot in March 1866, Governor Paul Dillingham was expected to appoint someone from the west side of the Green Mountains, in keeping with the Republican Party's Mountain Rule. He first considered former Governor J. Gregory Smith. When Smith indicated that he would not accept, Dillingham turned to Edmunds, who had favorably impressed Dillingham during their service together in the State Senate, and whose residence in Burlington was on the west side of the state. Edmunds subsequently won reelection in 1868, 1874, 1880 and 1886, and served from April 1866 until resigning in November 1891.

In the Senate, Edmunds took an active part in the attempt to impeach President Andrew Johnson in 1868, having helped pass the Tenure of Office Act to rebuke Johnson.

Although considering himself devoted to the principles of the Republican Party, like most congressional "Half-Breeds", Edmunds staunchly supported civil service reform. This was opposed by the conservative "Stalwart" faction, who supported maintaining the spoils system as a way to reward political supporters and punish political enemies.

Edmunds was influential in providing for the electoral commission to decide the disputed presidential election of 1876 and served as one of the commissioners, voting for Republicans Rutherford B. Hayes and William A. Wheeler.

He was the author of the Edmunds Act against polygamy in Utah and the Sherman Antitrust Act to limit monopolies.

In 1882 President Chester A. Arthur nominated Senator Roscoe Conkling to replace the retiring Ward Hunt as an Associate Justice of the United States Supreme Court. When Conkling declined, Arthur chose Edmunds, who also declined. The appointment ultimately went to Samuel Blatchford.

Senate leadership positions
Edmunds served as chairman of the Committee on Pensions from 1869 to 1873, the Committee on the Judiciary from 1872 to 1879 and again from 1881 to 1891, the Committee on Private Land Claims from 1879 to 1881 and the Committee on Foreign Relations in 1881.  He was President pro tempore of the Senate from 1883 to 1885 and chairman of the Republican Conference from 1885 to 1891.

Reputation in the Senate
While serving in Congress he continued to practice law, as did many other members of Congress at the time.  He held retainers from railroads and other corporations, including those which could be affected by Senate action.

An acerbic debater, he often favored the status quo or slow progress.  He was known for making his colleagues feel the sting of his criticisms, and some thought him better at merely opposing than offering constructive alternatives.  David Davis joked that he could make Edmunds vote against any measure by simply phrasing the request for votes in the New England town meeting way: "Contrary-minded will say no."  One friend trying to interest him in a presidential bid pleaded, "But, Edmunds, think how much fun you would have vetoing bills."

Edmunds took special delight in goading southern senators into blurting out statements that would embarrass the Democratic Party.  To those southerners opposed to any federal role in protecting blacks' right to vote, Edmunds seemed the epitome of Yankee evil. One southern correspondent in 1880 wrote, "When I look at that man sitting almost alone in the Senate, isolated in his gloom of hate and bitterness, stern, silent, watchful, suspicious and pitiless, I am reminded of the worst types of Puritan character... You see the impress of the purer persecuting spirit that burned witches, drove out Roger Williams, hounded Jonathan Edwards for doing his sacred duty, maligned Jefferson, and like a toad squatted at the ear of the Constitution it had failed to pervert."

Friendship with Allen G. Thurman
In spite of contempt from many Democratic colleagues, Edmunds formed friendships from across the aisle. One Democrat with no reason to appreciate him wrote a colleague that among all the Republicans, "Edmunds made the most impression upon me.  I couldn't help admiring his clear and incisive way of putting a question, although it appeared to me that his manner is occasionally very irritating.  This manner of his is very much that of a lawyer employed as counsel in a case, who therefore makes ex parte statements, and thinks it fair to make all manner of allegations."  His closest friend in the chamber for many years was the ranking Democrat on the Judiciary Committee, Allen G. Thurman of Ohio.

Edmunds and Thurman shared similar reformist attitudes. When Edmunds ran for president in 1884, the other candidates included the eventual nominee, James G. Blaine, a Half-Breed. During the campaign, Edmunds touted his alliance with Thurman, which in turn was cited as a positive quality by cartoonist Thomas Nast, an anti-Blaine Mugwump and illustrator for Harper's Weekly. At Thurman's death in 1895, Edmunds spoke highly of the former Ohio senator as "brave in his convictions."

Presidential candidacies
Edmunds was a candidate for president at the 1880 Republican National Convention.  Nominated by Frederick H. Billings, he received 34 votes on the first ballot.  His support remained at 31 or 32 votes through the 29th ballot, after which his supporters began to trend towards eventual nominee James A. Garfield.

In 1884, Republicans who favored civil service reform, including Theodore Roosevelt, supported Edmunds for President over incumbent President Chester A. Arthur and former Senator James G. Blaine, hoping to build a groundswell for Edmunds if the two stronger candidates deadlocked.  Revelations about Edmunds's legal work for railroads and corporations while sitting in the Senate prevented Edmunds from attaining wide support from reformers. On the first ballot he received 93 votes, but his support declined, and the nomination went to Blaine on the fourth ballot.  Edmunds was among the Republicans who refused support for Blaine (some backed Cleveland outright), who ultimately lost the general election to Grover Cleveland.

Although Sen. Blaine came to become the leader of the Half-Breeds in the 1880 presidential election, he was viewed with suspicion and distrust by Edmunds, who believed that a true Half-Breed must support civil service reform. Indeed, Blaine's inclinations in the late 1870s were closer to that of the Stalwarts, evident in his hostility towards civil service reform and the policies pursued by Half-Breed Rutherford B. Hayes.

During the campaign, Edmunds stated:

Intraparty backlash, 1886
Edmunds' refusal to support Blaine consequentially led to immense opposition from Republicans who pushed to deny him re-election in the 1886 midterms. A supporter of Blaine said of the Vermont senator:

When the election drew closer, newspapers covering the race became either increasingly supportive or opposing towards Edmunds. The Vermont Watchman, which was noted for defending his stance on Blaine in 1884, turned the other direction and harshly attacked Edmunds. A number of smaller papers split, and the Burlington Free Press affirmed its support for the incumbent senator.

Blaine himself held a strong contempt for Edmunds, and many of the former's supporters likely financed the movement to oust him. Despite such a fierce effort, Edmunds ultimately retained his seat when the state legislature soundly re-elected him.

At Arthur's funeral in 1886, Edmunds extended his hand to Blaine.  His Maine colleague, recalling the 1884 campaign, refused to shake it.

Senate resignation, retirement and death
Edmunds resigned from the Senate in 1891 in order to start a law practice in Philadelphia, Pennsylvania.

He later retired to Pasadena, California where he died on February 27, 1919.  He was buried at Green Mount Cemetery in Burlington.

Family
In 1852 Edmunds married Susan Marsh Lyman (1831–1916), a niece of George Perkins Marsh.  They had two daughters.

Awards
Among Edmunds's honors were an honorary Master of Arts from the University of Vermont and honorary LL.D. degrees from Middlebury College, Dartmouth College and the University of Vermont.

Legacy
Edmunds Elementary and Middle Schools in Burlington, which share a complex, opened as the city's high school in 1900 on land donated by Edmunds, and became a middle and elementary grades facility in 1964.

Mount Rainier's Edmunds Glacier and the town of Edmonds, Washington (despite the spelling) are named for him.

The Vermont Historical Society maintains the George F. Edmunds Fund, which awards an annual prize for student research and writing on Vermont history.

His birthplace in Richmond, Vermont is a privately owned residence and farm, and marked by a Vermont Historic Sites Commission sign.

See also
Edmunds–Tucker Act

References

External links

1828 births
1919 deaths
People from Richmond, Vermont
Republican Party United States senators from Vermont
Republican Party members of the Vermont House of Representatives
Presidents pro tempore of the United States Senate
Chairmen of the Senate Committee on Foreign Relations
Candidates in the 1884 United States presidential election
Speakers of the Vermont House of Representatives
Republican Party Vermont state senators
Presidents pro tempore of the Vermont Senate
Politicians from Burlington, Vermont
People from Pasadena, California
Vermont lawyers
Pennsylvania lawyers
19th-century American lawyers
Pennsylvania Republicans
California Republicans
Civil service reform in the United States
Half-Breeds (Republican Party)